Versus is a 2016 Russian sports-drama film directed by Nurbek Egen. It was released on November 3, 2016 (in Russia).

Plot
When MMA fighter Victor gets into a car accident, the bandit Shark threatens to kill his beloved girl if he does not agree to throw a fight in the ring.

Filming
The movie was filmed partly in Saint Petersburg. For filming Birzhevoy Bridge was blocked, which connects the Vasilyevsky Island with the Petrograd side.

Cast
 Aleksey Chadov as Victor Stroev aka Russian Hammer
 Oksana Akinshina as Vera
 Anton Shagin as Shark
 Sergey Chirkov as Alik
 Melvin Manhoef as Manuel Rivera aka Typhoon

Marketing
Movie trailer was released online September 7, 2016.

Facts
 All the scenes of fights with Aleksey Chadov were filmed without stunt doubles.

References

External links 

2010s sports drama films
Russian sports drama films
Russian boxing films
2016 drama films